Stacey Fluhler (née Waaka; born 3 November 1995) is a New Zealand rugby union player. She plays fifteen-a-side and seven-a-side rugby union, and is a member of the New Zealand Women's Sevens team and New Zealand Women's National Rugby Union team. Fluhler was a member of the New Zealand Women's Sevens team when they won a gold medal at the 2020 Summer Olympics in Tokyo. She was also a member of the New Zealand fifteen-a-side team which won the 2017 Women's Rugby World Cup and the  2021 Women's Rugby World Cup.

Early life
Fluhler was born Stacey Jamie Aroha Kirsten Waaka on 3 November 1995 in Papakura, New Zealand to Raewyn (nee Allan) and Simon Waaka. She has four older siblings, Shannon, Bronson and Beaudein and was the only one born in New Zealand as her parents moved the family moved back and forth between Australia and Auckland several times. When she was one years old the family moved back to Australia, and lived in Melbourne for eight years. One Christmas, she and her brother Beaudein spent time with their grandmother Kiri on the farm and didn’t want to leave. As a result her parents decided to move back permanently in 2005 to farm in Ruatoki in the eastern Bay of Plenty.

Her father had 17 siblings, and as a result Fluhler has more than 70 first cousins, many of them resident in the area around Ruatoki
Her father played rugby and so did her brothers, while her sister played netball and mother in her youth played athletics, gymnastics, tennis and netball.

in 2011, at the age of 15 Fluhler was on her way home in a school bus from Trident High School in Whakatane when it was hit from behind by an unladen truck. The impact was sufficient to throw her from her seat, and she came to lying in the aisle of the bus, on top of other children. Using her cellphone she called the police for help before assisting some of the injured children off the bus, including her niece and nephew, She then walked to a nearby Matariki Early Childhood Centre to telephone her mother before after returning to the crash site she helped other children. In all 36 people were injured with 28 taken to hospitals, many of them with broken bones. Fluhler received lacerations to her legs which prevented her playing sports for a few months.

Rugby career
By the age of 15 Fluhler was a New Zealand touch youth international and promising netball player.

While encouraged to consider playing rugby by friends and coaches at school she rejected the game as she had her heart set on representing New Zealand at netball. After she heard through ads on TV in 2012 for the “Go for Gold” programme that Sevens rugby was to be an Olympic sport, she realised she could have an opportunity to play rugby full-time. As a result despite some concerns over tackling she decided to give rugby a go. As a result at the age of 16 she was one of the 800 young women who attended the “Go for Gold” Sevens trials in 2012 organized to identify talent with the potential to represent New Zealand in the Sevens competition at the Rio Olympics. At the trial she attended she was put through various fitness, rugby skills and character assessment activities. However she wasn’t prepared to commit to the Sevens as she wanted to enjoy high school. It wasn’t until she began playing for the Waikato women's team that she was noticed in 2014 and was invited to attend a couple of Sevens training camps.

Fluhler debuted for the Black Ferns in 2015, the same year her brother Beaudein Waaka made his Rugby sevens debut for New Zealand.

In 2016, she was selected for the development squad for the women's sevens and made her international debut in that form of the game.

Fluhler was a member of the victorious 2017 Women's Rugby World Cup squad. That year she graduated from the University of Waikato in the Bachelor of Sport and Leisure Studies with a major in Sport Management.

With Portia Woodman out of commission since October 2018 as a result of an Achilles tendon injury Fluhler filled her shoes to become the dominant try scorer during the 2018–19 World Rugby Women's Sevens Series season. She was also selected for four out of five Dream Teams and was also awarded two Impact Player of the Tournament titles. It was during this period that she acquired the nickname "The Smiling Assassin".

Fluhler was named in the Black Ferns Sevens squad for the 2022 Commonwealth Games in Birmingham. She won a bronze medal at the event. She later won a silver medal at the 2022 Rugby World Cup Sevens in Cape Town.

Fluhler made the Black Ferns 32-player squad for the 2021 Rugby World Cup. She scored a try in the tense 25–24 semi-final clash with France. She also scored in the final against England as the Black Ferns went on to claim their sixth Rugby World Cup title.

Television career
Alongside Liam Messam and Erena Mikaere, Fluhler was presenter in 2021 on Te Ao Toa, a weekly sports show on Maori TV.

Awards and honours
Fluhler won the Junior Māori Sportswoman of the Year award in 2015.

Because of the courage she had shown during a bus crash in 2011 Fluhler was selected in 2019 by World Rugby to be a member of The Unstoppables XV. This was a team of women who’ve overcome barriers to participate in rugby. It was part an the year long initiative to boost the profile of the women’s game globally.

At the 2020 World Rugby Sevens Series Awards Fluhler won the impact player award, the top try scorer awards and was selected as a member of that year's women's dream team.

Personal life
Of Māori descent, she affiliates to the Ngāi Tūhoe iwi.  She married Ricky Fluhler in late 2019.

References

External links
 
 Stacey Fluher at Black Ferns

1995 births
Living people
People educated at Whakatane High School
Rugby union players from Whakatāne
New Zealand women's international rugby union players
New Zealand female rugby union players
New Zealand Māori rugby union players
Female rugby union players
University of Waikato alumni
New Zealand female rugby sevens players
New Zealand women's international rugby sevens players
Rugby sevens players at the 2018 Commonwealth Games
Commonwealth Games rugby sevens players of New Zealand
Commonwealth Games gold medallists for New Zealand
Commonwealth Games medallists in rugby sevens
Rugby sevens players at the 2020 Summer Olympics
Medalists at the 2020 Summer Olympics
Olympic rugby sevens players of New Zealand
Olympic gold medalists for New Zealand
Olympic medalists in rugby sevens
20th-century New Zealand women
21st-century New Zealand women
Rugby sevens players at the 2022 Commonwealth Games
Medallists at the 2018 Commonwealth Games
Medallists at the 2022 Commonwealth Games